Parliamentary elections were held in Abkhazia on 12 March 2022, with a second round taking place on 26 March.

Campaign
Abkhazia is a republic whose territory is part of Georgia and which proclaimed itself independent in 1992. Only Russia, Nicaragua, Venezuela, Nauru and Syria recognize this independence. In the previous parliamentary elections in 2017, Georgia said it considered these elections illegal under international law, with its Foreign Minister condemning the vote as "a new attempt to legitimize ethnic cleansing, military intervention and occupation of Georgian territory resulting from Russian aggression."

123 candidates – 107 men and 16 women – ran for seats in the 35-member People's Assembly. 19 nominees were incumbent lawmakers running for re-election. The Abkhaz central election commission closed registration for candidates on 2 March. The Abkhaz government opposition requested a prolongation of the current legislature term to launch an impeachment process against president Aslan Bzhania but those requests were not answered.

Electoral system
The 35 members of the unicameral People's Assembly are elected from single-member constituencies by parallel voting for five year terms.

Results by constituency 

17 of the 35 constituencies elected members in the first round. At least 15 of these seats were held by supporters of the government.

1st Constituency (New District)

2nd Constituency (New District)

3rd Constituency (Stariy Poselok)

4th Constituency (Severny)

5th Constituency (Sinopsky)

6th Constituency (Centralny)

7th Constituency (Biblioteka)

8th Constituency (Mayaksky)
Another election will be held on 28 May in the 8th constituency as both candidates received the same number of votes in the second round, a first in Abkhaz history.

9th Constituency (Vostochny)

10th Constituency (Pitsundsky)

11th Constituency (Bzypsky)

12th Constituency (Gagrsky)

13th Constituency (Gagrsky Gorodskoy)

14th Constituency (Tsandrypshsky)

15th Constituency (Otkharsky)

16th Constituency (Duripshsky)

17th Constituency (Lykhnynsky)

18th Constituency (Gudautsky Gorodskoy Pervy)

Neither candidate in the 18th constituency won a majority of the vote (invalid votes are counted). For Leonid Lakerbaia, it was the difference of a single voice. According to the law, another election will be held on 14 May.

19th Constituency (Gudautsky Gorodskoy Vtoroy)

20th Constituency (Aatsynskiy)

21st Constituency (Novoafonsky)

22nd Constituency (Eshersky)

23rd Constituency (Gumistinsky)

24th Constituency (Pshapsky)

25th Constituency (Macharsky)

26th Constituency (Drandsky)

27th Constituency (Baslakhusky)

28th Constituency (Gupsky)

29th Constituency (Chlousky)

30th Constituency (Kutolsky)

31st Constituency (Kyndygsky)

32nd Constituency (Ochamchyrsky)

33rd Constituency (Tkuarchalskiy Pervyy)

34th Constituency (Tkuarchalskiy Vtoroy)

35th Constituency (Galsky)

Aftermath 

Elections in the first round were accompanied by relatively low turnout, averaging 51%, and in some constituencies, notably Sukhumi and West Abkhazia, it was well below 40%. This has raised questions from some media observers about the local politicians' trust in the general population. There were reports of candidates ignoring the normal debates and focusing on service in their local communities instead, including installing new power transformers and fixing up rural roads. This was accompanied by candidates who had not been involved in politics winning or advancing to the second round at a high rate.

Government formation 
Parties and candidates in favor of Aslan Bzhania won an absolute majority after the results of the second round.

On 12 April 2022 Lasha Ashuba, generally seen as an ally of Bzhania, was unanimously elected as speaker by the 33 already elected deputies to the People's Assembly, as two members are yet to be elected in repeat elections.

References

Parliamentary elections in Abkhazia
Parliamentary
Abkhazia
Election and referendum articles with incomplete results